The 2011 ITF Women's Circuit is the 2011 edition of the second-tier tour for women's professional tennis. It is organised by the International Tennis Federation and is a tier below the WTA Tour. During the months of January 2011 and March 2011 over 50 tournaments were played.

Key

January

February

March

See also 
 2011 ITF Women's Circuit
 2011 ITF Women's Circuit (April–June)
 2011 ITF Women's Circuit (July–September)
 2011 ITF Women's Circuit (October–December)
 2011 WTA Tour

 01-03